Daktuy is a rural locality (a selo) and the administrative center of Daktuyskoye Rural Settlement of Magdagachinsky District, Amur Oblast, Russia. The population was 590 as of 2018. There are 14 streets.

Geography 
Daktuy is located 42 km southeast of Magdagachi (the district's administrative centre) by road. Magdagachi is the nearest rural locality.

References 

Rural localities in Magdagachinsky District